UPDF Simba FC is a Ugandan football club based in Lugazi. They are the country's Army club. They were a dominant force in the 1970s and 1980s when all the players were serving officers in the Army.

Achievements
African Cup of Champions Clubs: 0
Finalist : 1972

Ugandan Premier League: 2
1971, 1978

Ugandan Cup: 2
1977, 2011

Performance in CAF competitions
 African Cup of Champions Clubs: 4 appearances
1972: Finalist
1973: Second Round
1974: First Round
1979: First Round

CAF Cup Winners' Cup: 2 appearances
1978 – First Round
1999 – Second Round

Current squad
Confirmed squad to 2021/22 season.

References

External links
Team profile – The Biggest Football Archive of the World

Football clubs in Uganda